The Iowa Child Welfare Research Station attached to the University of Iowa conducted pioneering research into child development and child psychology during the 20th century.  German-American psychologist Kurt Zadek Lewin worked there and Robert Richardson Sears directed the station for much of the 1940s.  Many other eminent psychologists, physiologists, and researchers were associated with the station and its work.

In 1963 the station was renamed the Institute of Child Behavior and Development due to negative association amongst the public with the phrase "Child Welfare". In 1974 the Institute was closed as a research establishment.

History

The station was founded in 1917.  A leader of the Iowa Congress of Mothers (a chapter of the National Congress of Mothers, which later became the Parent-Teacher Association) named Cora Bussey Hillis arranged for the station to be sited at the University of Iowa and procured funding from the state legislature and the Women's Christian Temperance Union. Hillis worked with Carl Emil Seashore, then the head of the psychology department at the University of Iowa, to establish the station. Seashore helped author the following law, which was eventually signed into law in 1917:

With the exception of a stint of military service during World War I Dr. Bird T. Baldwin served as the first director of the station until his death on May 13, 1928.

In 1922 the station listed these employees:

 Director Baldwin
 Paid, full time—4 nurses, 1 social worker, 3 clerical or other helpers.
 Paid, part time—1 physician, 1 nurse, 1 social worker, 3 clerical or other helpers.
 Volunteer, part time—4 physicians.

Research
The Station was the first institution in the world devoted to the study of the "normal child." Among its contributions to this field of knowledge, the Station conducted studies in the normal physical growth rates of children, studies in intellectual development in children and its relation to environment, studies in classroom management techniques that support positive outcomes, and developed collections of data regarding speech development and therapy for children with cerebral palsy. The Station also helped establish research standards for conducting research into child development.

References

External links 
 Pictures from the Iowa Child Welfare Research Station in the Iowa Digital Library, University of Iowa Libraries
 Iowa Child Welfare Research Station at University of Iowa Hospitals and Clinics, archived at WebCite at https://web.archive.org/web/20090103234828/http://www.uihealthcare.com/depts/medmuseum/galleryexhibits/womeninhealth/icwrs/anthro.html
 "Forces Behind Food Habits and Methods of Change" by Kurt Zadek Lewin, an account of research performed at the Station.  From the book The Problem of Changing Food Habits Report of the Committee on Food Habits 1941-1943.
 Publications of the Station at the Internet Archive

University of Iowa
Child-related organizations in the United States
United States
Organizations established in 1917
1917 establishments in Iowa